Diego Díez (15 December 1896 – 7 November 1936) was a Spanish epee and foil fencer. He competed at the 1924 and 1928 Summer Olympics. He died in the Paracuellos massacres.

References

External links
 

1896 births
1936 deaths
Spanish male épée fencers
Olympic fencers of Spain
Fencers at the 1924 Summer Olympics
Fencers at the 1928 Summer Olympics
Fencers from Madrid
Military personnel killed in the Spanish Civil War
Spanish casualties of the Spanish Civil War
Spanish male foil fencers
Olympians killed in warfare